Karulai is a small town and panchayath in Nilambur Taluk of Malappuram district. It is situated on the banks of the Karimpuzha River. Edakkara, Nilambur, Pookkottumpadam, and Vaniyambalam are the nearest towns.

Tourist attraction

Karulai is the "gods' own village" in Kerala State with green forest, and has a variety of animals and fish in the River Karimpuzha. A considerable area of the Karulai village is forest which includes the Nedumkayam Rainforest.

Nedumkayam
Nedumkayam is 14 km from Nilambur town, in Malappuram district, Kerala, India. Nedumkayam is noted especially for its rich rain forests. The wooden resthouse built here by the British offers a panoramic view of the elephant and deer grazing in the forest nearby . One has to get prior permission from the Indian Forest Service to enter the forest zone. Heavy restrictions are imposed as a measure to save the existing forest land. An elephant taming center is also located here. Nilambur including Nedumkayam has been  selected for being developed as Kerala's second ecotourism destination. It is very beautiful and very good tourist center. There is a huge demand for the last several years to create the Nilambur - Karulai - Silent Valley - Coimbatore road. Nedumkayam rainforest is a part of Nilgiri's Biosphere Resreve.People rave about the fresh air and clear water that flows through, along with rare species of flora and fauna, and this is home to almost all of the mammals in western ghats and more than 200 species of birds hence classifying it as an important bird area.

Road distances
 Nilambur to Karulayi. 10 km
 Karulayi to Nedungayam. 7 km
karulai to pookottumpadam 9 km
karulai to Edakkara 9 km

Naxalite threat
In 24 November 2016, three naxalites were killed in an encounter with Kerala police. Naxalite leader Kappu Devaraj from Andhra Pradesh is included in the list of killed in the incident. 
Villages like Mundakkadavu, Kalkullam and Uchakkulam near Karulai are threatened by Naxalite attacks.  Naxalites visit the locality regularly and ask for food and shelter from the tribals.  The police are also combing the area regularly but have not arrested any naxalites. 
On 27 September 2016, there was firing between the Maoists and the Kerala police in this area and no one was injured in this incident.

Tribal villages
 Nedumkayam
 Mancheeri
 Mundakkadavu
 Uchakkulam
 Kalkkulam

Villages and suburbs
 Chandakkunnu, Mukkatta and VEllappuzha
 Mutheeri, Nallamthanni Pulliyil and valavu
 Mailampara. Varikkal. Chettiyil. Kottuppara.
 Cherupuzha

Important landmarks

 Kottayil book house karulai
 Tharbiyathul Ouladh Madhrassa
 Kunhamutty Memorial Higher Secondary School
 Organic Vegetable Cluster, Krishi Bhavan
 Karulayi Panchayath Office, School Road.
 Town Juma Masjid
 SYS. SSF. Karulai.  Sector . S B S.
 karulai juma masjid Pallipadi
 SKSSF town unit Pallipadi
 Nambola footwear karulai
 M D I Public School Karulai
 Burma Petrolium Pallippadi. Karulai.
 Jubilee Medicals. Karulai.

References

Villages in Malappuram district